Henry O'Neil may refer to:

 Henry Nelson O'Neil (1817–1880), historical genre painter and minor Victorian writer
 Henry O'Neil (bishop) (1907–1997), bishop in Canada

See also
 Henry O'Neill (disambiguation)
Henry O'Neal, in Flirtation Walk